Ivan Apostolov (born 20 December 1941) is a Bulgarian former modern pentathlete. He competed at the 1968 Summer Olympics.

References

1941 births
Living people
Bulgarian male modern pentathletes
Olympic modern pentathletes of Bulgaria
Modern pentathletes at the 1968 Summer Olympics
Sportspeople from Sofia